Vestlandsbonden was a Norwegian newspaper, published in Bergen in Hordaland county.

De Yngre Norske Landmænds Blad was started on 14 October 1904 as an organ for farmers. It changed its name to Vestlandsbonden from 5 January 1911, but after its last issue on 26 June 1915 it was incorporated into Bondebladet. It was published in Bergen.

References

1904 establishments in Norway
1915 disestablishments in Norway
Defunct newspapers published in Norway
Newspapers published in Bergen
Norwegian-language newspapers
Publications established in 1904
Publications disestablished in 1915